is one of the  Three Mountains of Dewa in the city of Tsuruoka, the ancient province of Dewa (a domain consisting of modern-day Yamagata Prefecture and Akita Prefecture), Japan.

A path of 2,446 stone steps leads to its summit amidst 600-year-old sugi trees, past the famous Gojūnotō (五重塔) five story pagoda, Grandpa cedar (jijisugi 爺杉), the 1000 years old cedar tree, and numerous shrines. The steps and the pagoda are listed as National Treasures. Sanjingōsaiden shrine (三神合祭殿) at the summit venerates the spirits of all three mountains.

The summit can also be reached by bus service.  In addition to religious pilgrims, travellers often stay at the Saikan temple lodgings.

Gallery

See also
List of Special Places of Scenic Beauty, Special Historic Sites and Special Natural Monuments

References

External links

Shinto shrines in Yamagata Prefecture
Haguro
National Treasures of Japan
Sacred mountains of Japan
 Mount Haguro Page (English)
 English information about Mount Haguro